Sezimovo Ústí is a town in Tábor District in the South Bohemian Region of the Czech Republic. It has about 7,000 inhabitants.

Administrative parts
Sezimovo Ústí is formed by one administrative part.

Etymology
The name literally means "Sezima's river mouth".

Geography

Sezimovo Ústí is urbanistically fused with the neighbouring towns Tábor in the north and Planá nad Lužnicí in the south.

Sezimovo Ústí lies in the Tábor Uplands It is situated at the confluence of the Lužnice river (which makes the border of the municipal territory) and the Chotovinský Stream (also called Kozský in the length where it flows through the town). On one of the tributaries of the Chotovisnký Stream there is a fish pond called Jezero.

History

According to legend, Sezimovo Ústí was founded by Sezima, an illegitimate son of Witiko of Prčice. The town was established in the first half of the 13th century. The first mention of Autz - Ústí is from 1250 when the general chapter of the Dominican Order agreed to the consecration of the monastery church to saint Dominic. The town prospered, which resulted from a convenient place on the way from Austria to Prague. Only 6 years after the church was consecrated the monastery was expanded so the town must have already be prospůerous enough to allow investment like that. The town was later fortified and had three suburbs, one of them on the other other bank of the river Lužnice. From 1388 the independent parish church had its own hospital and school.

In 1414, Jan Hus was invited to Sezimovo Ústí to preach in Kozí hrádek Castle, which led the radicalization of many people and establishment of Hussite movement. In 1420, Hussites burned down the town and left to the nearby newly established town of Tábor. Some parts of the abandoned town were still used in the time of king George of Poděbrady and the Dominican friars returned to the damaged monastery in the 1430s for some time.

The ruins of the monastery were still quite big as is visible on painting from 1811 by count Eugen Czernin. ¨Water mill and one farm was also on the grounds of the old town from most of the time after the town was abandoned.
In 1828, a new village of 81 houses was founded and was named Starý Tábor or Alt Tabor in german ("Old Tábor"). For construction of the first houses the ruins of the old town was used as building material. Construction of the new church started in 1835 and it was consecrated in 1841. In 1920, it returned to its historical name of Sezimovo Ústí. In 1939, the entrepreneur Jan Antonín Baťa began to built a factory, that was initially intended to be build in Slovakia, and a new district of Sezimovo Ústí near the factory on the lands of the Velký dvůr, nowadays called Baťov, Kovák or Sezimovo Ústí 2. Baťa built a factory as well as accommodation and infrastructure for his employees at the factory.
From 1942 to 1945 it was part of the town Tábor as one of the 15 villages that were joined to form town of Big Tábor. Sezimovo Ústí became town in 1960.

Demographics

Transport
The D3 motorway runs next to the town. The Train line 221 from Prague to České Budějovice runs thru the town and there is train stop in the part of the town called Sezimovo Ústí 2.

Sport 
The main sport clubs in Sezimovo Ústí are TJ Spartak MAS and TJ Sokol Sezimovo Ústí. Sezimovo Ústí has one swimming pool. In the past the motorcycle race Pohár Prezidenta republiky was held in the town.

Sights

Kozí hrádek is a castle ruin near Sezimovo Ústí, known for activities of Jan Hus. It is unknown when it was built, but it was first mentioned in 1377. It was built in Gothic style. In 1438, it was burnt down. The castle is a national cultural heritage site and nowadays the ruins are accessible.

The villa of Czechoslovak president Edvard Beneš in Sezimovo Ústí was his favourite place of recreation, and the site of his burial. The villa's garden it the grave is open to the public and the villa itself is open only on certain dates during the year as it is still used by the Government of the Czech Republic. There is also the monument with an exposition of political and social life of E. Beneš and his wife.

The Church of Exaltation of the Holy Cross was built in the late Empire style in 1841. In the park near the town hall there is a stone baptismal font and few stone fragments as the only remains from the original town which stood here until 1420.

Notable people
Jan Hus (1371–1415), theologian, philosopher and reformer; preached here
Edvard Beneš (1884–1948), politician, President of Czechoslovakia; died here
Václav Kaplický (1895–1982) writer, journalist and epic poet
Bohumil Cepák (1951–2021), handball player

International relations
Sezimovo Ústí is a part of the Commonwealth of towns with hussite past and tradition, along with other 11 Czech and 6 German municipalities.

Twin towns – sister cities

Sezimovo Ústí is twinned with:
 Thierachern, Switzerland

References

External links

Cities and towns in the Czech Republic
Populated places in Tábor District